In Puerto Rico, there are 78 municipalities and 902 municipio subdivisions made up of 827 barrios and 75 barrios-pueblo. There are also a number of subbarrios and communities. The following is a list of the 902 barrios, some of the subbarrios, including the 40 subbarrios of Santurce, which is a barrio of San Juan and a few communities (on the U.S. Census) arranged in alphabetical order.

Barrios (which for US census purposes, are roughly comparable to minor civil divisions) in turn are further subdivided into smaller local populated place areas/units called sectores (sectors in English). The types of sectores may vary, from normally sector to urbanización to reparto to barriada to residencial, among others. Sectores are not on this list.



A

	Abra Honda, Camuy
	Abras, Corozal
	Aceitunas, Moca
	Achiote, Naranjito
   Adjuntas barrio-pueblo
	Aguacate, Aguadilla
	Aguacate, Yabucoa 
	Aguada barrio-pueblo 
	Aguadilla barrio-pueblo 
	Aguas Blancas, Yauco
	Aguas Buenas barrio-pueblo 
	Aguirre, Salinas 
	Aibonito, Hatillo
	Aibonito, San Sebastián
	Aibonito barrio-pueblo 
	Ala de la Piedra, Orocovis
	Algarrobo, Aibonito
	Algarrobo, Guayama
	Algarrobo, Vega Baja
	Algarrobo, Yauco
	Algarrobos, Mayagüez
	Almácigo Alto, Yauco
	Almácigo Bajo, Yauco 
	Almirante Norte, Vega Baja
	Almirante Sur, Vega Baja
   Alto del Cabro subbarrio, Santurce
	Alto Sano, Las Marías
	Alto Sano, San Sebastián
	Amparo subbarrio, Universidad
	Amuelas, Juana Díaz
	Añasco Abajo, Añasco
	Añasco Arriba, Añasco
	Añasco barrio-pueblo 
	Ancones, Arroyo
	Ancones, San Germán
	Ángeles, Utuado
	Anón, Ponce
	Anones, Las Marías
	Anones, Naranjito
	Antón Ruíz, Humacao
	Apeadero, Patillas
	Arecibo barrio-pueblo 
 	Arena, Guánica
 	Arenalejos, Arecibo
 	Arenales, Aguadilla
 	Arenales Altos, Isabela
 	Arenales Bajos, Isabela
 	Arenas, Cidra
 	Arenas, Utuado
 	Arroyo barrio-pueblo 
 	Arrozal, Arecibo
 	Asomante, Aguada
 	Asomante, Aibonito
 	Atalaya, Aguada
 	Atalaya, Rincón
	Auxilio Mutuo subbarrio, Universidad

B

	Bahomamey, San Sebastián
	Bairoa, Aguas Buenas
	Bairoa, Caguas
   Bajadero, Arecibo
	Bajo, Patillas
	Bajura, Cabo Rojo
	Bajura, Isabela
	Bajura, Vega Alta
	Bajura Adentro, Manatí
	Bajura Afuera, Manatí
	Ballajá subbarrio, San Juan Antiguo
	Barahona, Morovis
	Barceloneta barrio-pueblo 
	Barina, Yauco
	Barrancas, Barranquitas
	Barranquitas barrio-pueblo
	Barrazas, Carolina
	Barreal, Peñuelas
	Barrero, Guayanilla
	Barrero, Rincón
	Barros, Orocovis
	Bartolo, Lares
	Bateyes, Mayagüez
	Bauta Abajo, Orocovis
	Bauta Arriba, Orocovis
	Bayamón, Cidra
	Bayamón barrio-pueblo
	Bayamoncito, Aguas Buenas
	Bayaney, Hatillo
   Bayola subbarrio, Santurce 
	Beatriz, Caguas
	Beatriz, Cayey
	Beatriz, Cidra
	Bejucos, Isabela
	Bella Vista subbarrio, Hato Rey Sur
	Benavente, Hormigueros
	Bermejales, Orocovis
	Boca, Guayanilla
	Boca Velázquez, Santa Isabel
	Boquerón, Las Piedras
	Boquerón, Cabo Rojo
   Bolívar subbarrio, Santurce
	Borinquen, Aguadilla
	Borinquen, Caguas
	Borinquen subbarrio, Oriente
	Botijas, Orocovis
	Bucaná, Ponce
	Bucarabones, Las Marías
	Bucarabones, Maricao
	Buen Consejo subbarrio, Pueblo
	Buena Vista, Bayamón
	Buena Vista, Carolina 
	Buena Vista, Hatillo
	Buena Vista, Humacao
	Buena Vista, Las Marías
	Buenos Aires, Lares
   Buenos Aires subbarrio, Santurce

C

	 Cabezas, Fajardo
	 Cabo Caribe, Vega Baja
	 Cabo Rojo barrio-pueblo
	 Cacao, Carolina
	 Cacao, Quebradillas
	 Cacao Alto, Patillas
	 Cacao Bajo, Patillas
	 Cacaos, Orocovis
	 Caguabo, Añasco
	 Caguana, Utuado
	 Caguas barrio-pueblo 
	 Cagüitas, Aguas Buenas
	 Caimital Alto, Aguadilla
	 Caimital Bajo, Aguadilla
	 Caimital, Guayama
	 Caimito, Juncos
	 Caimito, San Juan
	 Caimito, Yauco
	 Caín Alto, San Germán
	 Caín Bajo, San Germán
	 Calabazas, San Sebastián
	 Calabazas, Yabucoa
	 Callabo, Juana Díaz
	 Callejones, Lares
	 Calvache, Rincón
	 Calzada, Maunabo
	 Camaceyes, Aguadilla
	 Camarones, Guaynabo
	 Cambalache, Arecibo
	 Camino Nuevo, Yabucoa
	 Campo Alegre, Hatillo
    Campo Alegre subbarrio, Santurce
	 Camuy Arriba, Camuy
	 Camuy barrio-pueblo 
	 Cañabón, Barranquitas
	 Cañabon, Caguas
	 Cañaboncito, Caguas
	 Canas, Ponce
	 Canas Urbano, Ponce
	 Candelaria, Lajas
	 Candelaria, Toa Baja
	 Candelaria, Vega Alta
	 Candelero Abajo, Humacao
	 Candelero Arriba, Humacao
	 Cangrejo Arriba, Carolina
	 Caníaco, Utuado
	 Canóvanas, Canóvanas
	 Canóvanas, Loíza
	 Canóvanas barrio-pueblo
	 Canovanillas, Carolina
	 Caño, Guánica
	 Caonillas Abajo, Utuado
	 Caonillas Abajo, Villalba
	 Caonillas Arriba, Utuado
	 Caonillas Arriba, Villalba
	 Caonillas, Aibonito
	 Capá, Moca
	 Capáez, Adjuntas
	 Capáez, Hatillo
	 Capetillo subbarrio, Pueblo
	 Capitanejo, Juana Díaz
	 Capitanejo, Ponce
	 Caracol, Añasco
	 Carenero, Guánica
	 Carite, Guayama
	 Carmen, Guayama
	 Carolina barrio-pueblo
	 Carraízo, Trujillo Alto
	 Carreras, Añasco
	 Carreras, Arecibo
	 Carrizal, Aguada
	 Carrizales, Hatillo
	 Carruzos, Carolina
	 Casey Abajo, Añasco
	 Casey Arriba, Añasco
	 Cataño, Humacao
	 Cataño barrio-pueblo
	 Catedral subbarrio, San Juan Antiguo
	 Cayaguas, San Lorenzo
	 Cayey barrio-pueblo
	 Cedrito, Comerío
	 Cedro, Carolina
	 Cedro, Cayey
	 Cedro, Guayanilla
	 Cedro Abajo, Naranjito
	 Cedro Arriba, Naranjito
	 Ceiba, Cidra
	 Ceiba, Las Piedras
	 Ceiba, Vega Baja
	 Ceiba barrio-pueblo
	 Ceiba Alta, Aguadilla
	 Ceiba Baja, Aguadilla
	 Ceiba Norte, Juncos
	 Ceiba Sur, Juncos
	 Cejas, Comerío
	 Celada, Gurabo
	 Central Aguirre, Salinas
	 Centro, Moca
	 Cercadillo, Cayey
	 Cerrillos, Ponce
	 Cerro Gordo, Aguada
	 Cerro Gordo, Añasco
	 Cerro Gordo, Bayamón
	 Cerro Gordo, Moca
	 Cerro Gordo, San Lorenzo
	 Cerrote, Las Marías
	 Certenejas, Cidra
	 Chamorro, Las Marías
	 Charcas, Quebradillas
    Chícharo subbarrio, Santurce
	 Chupacallos, Ceiba
	 Ciales barrio-pueblo
	 Cialitos, Ciales
	 Cibao, Camuy
	 Cibao, San Sebastián
	 Cibuco, Corozal
	 Cibuco, Vega Baja
	 Cidra, Añasco
	 Cidra barrio-pueblo
	 Cidral, San Sebastián
	 Ciénaga, Guánica
	 Ciénaga Alta, Río Grande
	 Ciénaga Baja, Río Grande
	 Ciénagas, Camuy
	 Cienegueta, Vega Alta
	 Cintrona, Juana Díaz
	 Ciudad Nueva subbarrio, Hato Rey Central
	 Coabey, Jayuya
	 Coamo Arriba, Coamo
	 Coamo barrio-pueblo
	 Cocos, Quebradillas
	 Collores, Humacao
	 Collores, Jayuya
	 Collores, Juana Díaz
	 Collores, Las Piedras
	 Collores, Orocovis
	 Collores, Yauco
	 Comerío barrio-pueblo
    Condadito subbarrio, Santurce
    Condado subbarrio, Santurce
	 Consejo, Guayanilla
	 Consejo, Utuado
	 Contorno, Toa Alta
	 Corcovada, Añasco
	 Corcovado, Hatillo
    Cordillera, Ciales
	 Corozal barrio-pueblo 
	 Corrales, Aguadilla
	 Costa, Lajas
	 Coto, Isabela
	 Coto, Peñuelas
	 Coto Laurel, Ponce
	 Coto Norte, Manatí
	 Coto Sur, Manatí
	 Cotuí, San Germán	
    Cruces, Aguada
    Cruces, Rincón
	 Cruz, Moca
    Cuarto, Ponce
    Cubuy, Canóvanas
    Cuchillas, Corozal
    Cuchillas, Moca
    Cuchillas, Morovis
	 Cuebas, Peñuelas
	 Cuevas, Trujillo Alto
	 Culebra barrio-pueblo
    Culebras Alto, Cayey
    Culebras Bajo, Cayey
	 Culebrinas, San Sebastián
	 Cupey, San Juan
    Cuyón, Aibonito
    Cuyón, Coamo

D

	Daguao, Ceiba
	Daguao, Naguabo
	Dagüey, Añasco
	Dajaos, Bayamón
	Damián Abajo, Orocovis
	Damián Arriba, Orocovis
	Demajagua, Fajardo
	Descalabrado, Santa Isabel
	Diego Hernández, Yauco
	Domingo Ruíz, Arecibo
	Dominguito, Arecibo
	Don Alonso, Utuado
	Doña Elena, Comerío
	Dorado barrio-pueblo
	Dos Bocas, Corozal
	Dos Bocas, Trujillo Alto
	Duey, Yauco
	Duey Alto, San Germán
	Duey Bajo, San Germán
	Duque, Naguabo

E

	Egozcue, Patillas
   El Cerro, Gurabo
	El Cinco, San Juan
	El Maní, Mayagüez
	El Río, Las Piedras
	El Vedado subbarrio, Hato Rey Norte
	Eleanor Roosevelt subbarrio, Hato Rey Norte
	Emajagua, Maunabo
	Emajagual, Juana Díaz
	Encarnación, Peñuelas
	Eneas, San Sebastián
	Ensenada, Guánica
	Ensenada, Rincón
	Esperanza, Arecibo
   Esperanza, Vieques
	Espinar, Aguada
	Espino, Añasco
	Espino, Lares
	Espino, Las Marías
	Espino, San Lorenzo
	Espinosa, Dorado
	Espinosa, Vega Alta

F

	Factor,  Arecibo
	Fajardo barrio-pueblo
	Farallón, Cayey
	Felicia 1, Santa Isabel
	Felicia 2, Santa Isabel
   Figueroa subbarrio, Santurce
	Flamenco, Culebra
	Floral Park subbarrio, Hato Rey Central
	Florencio, Fajardo
	Florida, San Lorenzo
	Florida, Vieques
	Florida Adentro, Florida
	Florida Afuera, Barceloneta
	Fraile, Culebra
	Frailes, Guaynabo
	Frailes, Yauco
	Fránquez, Morovis
	Frontón, Ciales
	Furnias, Las Marías

G

	Galateo, Toa Alta
	Galateo Alto, Isabela
	Galateo Bajo, Isabela
   Gandul subbarrio, Santurce
	Garrochales, Arecibo
	Garrochales, Barceloneta
	Garzas, Adjuntas
	Gato, Orocovis
	Gobernador Piñero, San Juan
	Guacio, San Sebastián
	Guadiana, Naranjito
	Guajataca, Quebradillas
	Guajataca, San Sebastián
	Guamá, San Germán
	Guamaní, Guayama
	Guanábano, Aguada
	Guanajibo, Cabo Rojo
	Guanajibo, Hormigueros
	Guanajibo, Mayagüez
	Guánica barrio-pueblo
	Guaniquilla, Aguada
	Guaonico, Utuado
	Guaraguao, Guaynabo
	Guaraguao, Ponce
	Guaraguao Abajo, Bayamón
	Guaraguao Arriba, Bayamón
	Guardarraya, Patillas
	Guásimas, Arroyo
	Guatemala, San Sebastián
	Guavate, Cayey
	Guayabal, Juana Díaz
	Guayabo, Aguada
	Guayabo Dulce, Adjuntas
	Guayabos, Isabela
	Guayabota, Yabucoa
	Guayacán, Ceiba
	Guayama barrio-pueblo
	Guayanilla barrio-pueblo
	Guaynabo barrio-pueblo
	Guayo, Adjuntas
	Guerrero, Aguadilla
	Guerrero, Isabela
	Guilarte, Adjuntas
	Gurabo barrio-pueblo
	Gurabo Abajo, Juncos
	Gurabo Arriba, Juncos
	Guzmán Abajo, Río Grande
	Guzmán Arriba, Río Grande

H

	Hatillo, Añasco
	Hatillo, Hatillo
	Hatillo barrio-pueblo
	Hato, San Lorenzo
	Hato Abajo, Arecibo
	Hato Arriba, Arecibo
	Hato Arriba, San Sebastián
	Hato Nuevo, Guaynabo
	Hato Nuevo, Gurabo
	Hato Puerco Abajo, Villalba
	Hato Puerco Arriba, Villalba
	Hato Puerco, Canóvanas
	Hato Rey, San Juan
	Hato Rey Central, San Juan
	Hato Rey Norte, San Juan
	Hato Rey Sur, San Juan
	Hato Tejas, Bayamón
	Hato Viejo, Arecibo
	Hato Viejo, Ciales
	Hayales, Coamo
	Helechal, Barranquitas
   Herrera subbarrio, Santurce
	Herreras, Río Grande
	Higuillar, Dorado
   Hipódromo subbarrio, Santurce
   Hoare subbarrio, Santurce
	Hoconuco Alto, San Germán
	Hoconuco Bajo, San Germán
	Honduras, Barranquitas
	Honduras, Cidra
	Hormigueros, Hormigueros
	Hormigueros barrio-pueblo
	Hoya Mala, San Sebastián
	Húcares, Naguabo
	Humacao barrio-pueblo
	Humatas, Añasco
	Hyde Park subbarrio, Hato Rey Sur

I

	Indiera Alta, Maricao
	Indiera Baja, Maricao
	Indiera Fría, Maricao
	Indios, Guayanilla
	Institución subbarrio, Universidad
	Isabel II barrio-pueblo, Vieques
	Isabela barrio-pueblo 
	Isla de Mona e Islote Monito, Mayagüez
   Isla Grande subbarrio, Santurce
   Isla Verde, Carolina
	Islote, Arecibo

J

	Jacaboa, Patillas
	Jacaguas, Juana Díaz
	Jácana, Yauco
	Jácanas, Yabucoa
	Jagua Pasto, Guayanilla
	Jagual, Patillas
	Jagual, San Lorenzo
	Jaguar, Gurabo
	Jaguas, Ciales
	Jaguas, Guayanilla
	Jaguas, Gurabo
	Jaguas, Peñuelas
	Jagüey, Aguada
	Jagüey, Rincón
	Jagüeyes, Aguas Buenas
	Jagüitas, Hormigueros
	Jájome Alto, Cayey
	Jájome Bajo, Cayey
	Jauca 1, Santa Isabel
	Jauca 2, Santa Isabel
	Jauca, Jayuya
	Jayuya Abajo, Jayuya
	Jayuya barrio-pueblo 
	Jiménez, Río Grande
	Jobos, Guayama
	Jobos, Isabela
   Joyuda, Cabo Rojo
	Juan Alonso, Mayagüez
	Juan Asencio, Aguas Buenas
	Juan González, Adjuntas
	Juan Martín, Luquillo
	Juan Martín, Yabucoa
	Juan Sánchez, Bayamón
	Juana Díaz barrio-pueblo
	Juncal, San Sebastián
	Juncos barrio-pueblo

L

	La Gloria, Trujillo Alto
   La Perla, San Juan
	La Torre, Lares
   La Zona subbarrio, Santurce
	La 37 subbarrio, Hato Rey Sur
	Lagunas, Aguada
	Lajas Arriba, Lajas
	Lajas barrio-pueblo
	Lajas, Lajas
	Lapa, Cayey
	Lapa, Salinas
	Lares, Lares
	Lares barrio-pueblo
   Las Casas subbarrio, Santurce
   Las Marías subbarrio, Santurce
	Las Marías barrio-pueblo
	Las Monjas subbarrio, Hato Rey Central
   Las Palmas subbarrio, Santurce
	Las Palmas, Utuado
	Las Piedras barrio-pueblo
	Lavadero, Hormigueros
	Leguísamo, Mayagüez
	Levittown, Toa Baja
	Limaní, Adjuntas
	Limón, Mayagüez
	Limón, Utuado
	Limones, Yabucoa
	Lirios, Juncos
	Lizas, Maunabo
	Llanadas, Isabela
	Llano, Guayanilla
	Llanos, Aibonito
	Llanos, Lajas
	Llanos Costa, Cabo Rojo
	Llanos Tuna, Cabo Rojo
	Llave, Vieques
   Loíza subbarrio, Santurce
	Loíza barrio-pueblo
	Lomas, Canóvanas
	Lomas, Juana Díaz
	Lomas, Naranjito
	López Sicardó subbarrio, Oriente
	Los Llanos, Coamo
	Luquillo barrio-pueblo

M

	Mabú, Humacao
	Macaná, Guayanilla
	Macaná, Peñuelas
	Machete, Guayama
	Machos, Ceiba
	Machuchal, Sabana Grande
   Machuchal subbarrio, Santurce
	Machuelo Abajo, Ponce
	Machuelo Arriba, Ponce
	Magas, Guayanilla
	Magos, San Sebastián
	Maguayo, Dorado
	Magueyes, Corozal
	Magueyes, Ponce
	Magueyes Urbano, Ponce
	Maizales, Naguabo
	Mal Paso, Aguada
	Maleza Alta, Aguadilla
	Maleza Baja, Aguadilla
	Malezas, Mayagüez
	Mambiche, Humacao
	Mamey, Aguada
	Mamey, Guaynabo
	Mamey, Gurabo
	Mamey, Juncos
	Mamey, Patillas
	Mameyal, Dorado
	Mameyes Abajo, Utuado
	Mameyes Arriba, Jayuya
	Mameyes I, Luquillo
	Mameyes II, Río Grande
	Maná, Corozal
	Manatí barrio-pueblo
	Maragüez, Ponce
	Maravilla Este, Las Marías
	Maravilla Norte, Las Marías
	Maravilla Sur, Las Marías
	Maresúa, San Germán
   María Moczó subbarrio, Santurce
	Mariana, Humacao
	Mariana, Naguabo
	Marías, Aguada
	Marías, Añasco
	Marías, Moca
	Maricao, Vega Alta
	Maricao Afuera, Maricao
	Maricao barrio-pueblo
	Marín, Patillas
   Marruecos subbarrio, Santurce
	Martín González, Carolina
	Martín Peña subbarrio, Hato Rey Norte
   Martín Peña subbarrio, Santurce
	Marueño, Ponce
	Masa, Gurabo
	Mata de Cañas, Orocovis
	Mata de Plátano, Luquillo
	Matón Abajo, Cayey
	Matón Arriba, Cayey
	Matuyas Alto, Maunabo
	Matuyas Bajo, Maunabo
	Maunabo barrio-pueblo
	Mavilla, Vega Alta
	Mayagüez Arriba, Mayagüez
	Mayagüez barrio-pueblo
	Media Luna, Toa Baja
	Medianía Alta, Loíza
	Medianía Baja, Loíza
   Melilla subbarrio, Santurce
	Membrillo, Camuy
	Mercado subbarrio, San Juan Antiguo
   Merhoff subbarrio, Santurce
   Milla de Oro, San Juan
	Minillas, Bayamón
	Minillas, San Germán
   Minillas subbarrio, Santurce
	Mirabales, San Sebastián
	Miradero, Cabo Rojo
	Miradero, Mayagüez
	Miraflores, Añasco
	Miraflores, Arecibo
	Mirasol, Lares
   Miramar subbarrio, Santurce
	Moca barrio-pueblo
	Monacillo, San Juan
	Monacillo Urbano, San Juan
	Montalva, Guánica
	Montaña, Aguadilla
	Monte Grande, Cabo Rojo
	Monte Llano, Cayey
	Monte Llano, Cidra
	Monte Llano, Morovis
   Monteflores, Santurce
	Montes Llanos, Ponce
	Monte Rey subbarrio, Pueblo
	Montones, Las Piedras
	Montoso, Maricao
	Montoso, Mayagüez
	Mora, Isabela
	Morovis barrio-pueblo
	Morovis Norte, Morovis
	Morovis Sud, Morovis
	Mosquito, Vieques
	Mucarabones, Toa Alta
	Mula, Aguas Buenas
	Mulas, Patillas
	Mulita, Aguas Buenas
	Muñoz Rivera, Patillas

N

	Naguabo barrio-pueblo
	Naranjales, Las Marías
	Naranjales, Mayagüez
	Naranjito, Hatillo
	Naranjito barrio-pueblo
	Naranjo, Aguada
	Naranjo, Comerío
	Naranjo, Fajardo
	Naranjo, Moca
	Naranjo, Yauco
	Navarro, Gurabo
	Negros, Corozal
	Nuevo, Bayamón
	Nuevo, Naranjito

O

   Obrero subbarrio, Santurce
   Ocean Park subbarrio, Santurce
	Oriente, San Juan
	Orocovis, Orocovis
	Orocovis barrio-pueblo
	Ortíz, Toa Alta
	Ovejas, Añasco

P

	Padilla, Corozal
	Pájaros, Bayamón
	Palma Escrita, Las Marías
   Palma Sola, Canóvanas
	Palmar, Aguadilla
	Palmarejo, Coamo
	Palmarejo, Corozal
	Palmarejo, Lajas
	Palmarito, Corozal
	Palmas, Arroyo
	Palmas, Cataño
	Palmas, Guayama
	Palmas, Salinas
	Palmas Altas, Barceloneta
	Palmas del Mar, Humacao
   Palmer, Río Grande
	Palo Hincado, Barranquitas
	Palo Seco, Maunabo
	Palo Seco, Toa Baja
	Palomas, Comerío
	Palos Blancos, Corozal
	Parguera, Lajas
   Parque subbarrio, Santurce
	París, Lajas
	Paso Palma, Utuado
	Pasto, Aibonito
	Pasto, Coamo
	Pasto, Guayanilla
	Pasto, Morovis
	Pasto Viejo, Cayey
	Patillas barrio-pueblo
	Pedernales, Cabo Rojo
	Pedro Ávila, Cayey
	Pedro García, Coamo
	Pellejas, Adjuntas
	Pellejas, Orocovis
	Peña Pobre, Naguabo
	Peñuelas barrio-pueblo
	Perchas, Morovis
	Perchas 1, San Sebastián
	Perchas 2, San Sebastián
	Pesas, Ciales
	Pezuela, Lares
	Pica, Jayuya
	Piedra Gorda, Camuy
	Piedras, Cayey
	Piedras Blancas, Aguada
	Piedras Blancas, San Sebastián
	Piletas, Lares
	Piñales, Añasco
	Piñas, Comerío
	Piñas, Toa Alta
	Pitahaya, Arroyo
	Pitahaya, Luquillo
	Planas, Isabela
	Plata, Aibonito
	Plata, Lajas
	Plata, Moca
	Playa, Añasco
	Playa, Guayanilla
	Playa, Ponce
	Playa, Santa Isabel
	Playa, Yabucoa
	Playa Sardinas I, Culebra
	Playa Sardinas II, Culebra
   Poblado de Boquerón, Cabo Rojo
	Pollos, Patillas
	Portillo, Adjuntas
	Portugués, Adjuntas
	Portugués, Ponce
	Portugués Urbano, Ponce
	Pozas, Ciales
	Pozas, San Sebastián
   Pozo del Hato, Santurce
	Pozo Hondo, Guayama
	Primero, Ponce
	Pueblo, Corozal
	Pueblo, Lares
	Pueblo, Moca
	Pueblo, Rincón
	Pueblo, San Juan
	Pueblo of Ponce, Ponce
	Pueblo of Río Piedras, San Juan
	Pueblo of San Germán, San Germán
	Pueblo Viejo, Guaynabo
	Puente, Camuy
	Puerta de Tierra subbarrio, San Juan Antiguo
	Puerto Diablo, Vieques
	Puerto Ferro, Vieques
	Puerto Nuevo, Vega Baja
	Puerto Nuevo subbarrio, Hato Rey Norte
	Puerto Real, Vieques
	Puertos, Camuy
	Pugnado Adentro, Vega Baja
	Pugnado Afuera, Vega Baja
   Pulguero subbarrio, Santurce
	Pulguillas, Coamo
	Punta Arenas, Vieques
	Punta Santiago, Humacao
	Puntas, Rincón
	Purísima Concepción, Las Marías

Q

	Quebrada, Camuy
	Quebrada, San Lorenzo
	Quebrada Arenas, Las Piedras
	Quebrada Arenas, Maunabo
	Quebrada Arenas, San Lorenzo
	Quebrada Arenas, Toa Alta
	Quebrada Arenas, Vega Baja
	Quebrada Arenas, San Juan
	Quebrada Arriba, Cayey
	Quebrada Arriba, Patillas
	Quebrada Ceiba, Peñuelas
	Quebrada Cruz, Toa Alta
	Quebrada Fajardo, Fajardo
	Quebrada Grande, Barranquitas
	Quebrada Grande, Mayagüez
	Quebrada Grande, Trujillo Alto
	Quebrada Honda, Guayanilla
	Quebrada Honda, San Lorenzo
	Quebrada Infierno, Gurabo
	Quebrada Larga, Añasco
	Quebrada Limón, Ponce
	Quebrada Negrito, Trujillo Alto
	Quebrada Seca, Ceiba
	Quebrada Vueltas, Fajardo
	Quebrada Yeguas, Salinas
	Quebradas, Guayanilla
	Quebradas, Yauco
	Quebradillas, Barranquitas
	Quebradillas barrio-pueblo
	Quemado, Mayagüez
	Quemados, San Lorenzo
	Quintana subbarrio, Hato Rey Central
	Quinto, Ponce

R

	Rabanal, Cidra
	Ranchera, Yauco
	Rayo, Sabana Grande
	Real, Ponce
	Retiro, San Germán
	Rincón, Cayey
	Rincón, Cidra
	Rincón, Gurabo
	Rincón, Sabana Grande
	Rincón barrio-pueblo
	Río, Guaynabo
	Río, Naguabo
	Río Abajo, Ceiba
	Río Abajo, Cidra
	Río Abajo, Humacao
	Río Abajo, Utuado
	Río Abajo, Vega Baja
	Río Arriba, Añasco
	Río Arriba, Arecibo
	Río Arriba, Fajardo
	Río Arriba, Vega Baja
	Río Arriba Poniente, Manatí
	Río Arriba Saliente, Manatí
	Río Blanco, Naguabo
	Río Cañas, Añasco
	Río Cañas, Caguas
	Río Cañas, Las Marías
	Río Cañas Abajo, Juana Díaz
	Río Cañas Abajo, Mayagüez
	Río Cañas Arriba, Juana Díaz
	Río Cañas Arriba, Mayagüez
	Río Grande, Aguada
	Río Grande, Jayuya
	Río Grande, Morovis
	Río Grande, Rincón
	Río Grande barrio-pueblo 
	Río Hondo, Comerío
	Río Hondo, Mayagüez
	Río Jueyes, Salinas
	Río Lajas, Dorado
	Río Lajas, Toa Alta
	Río Piedras, San Juan
	Río Piedras Antiguo subbarrio, Pueblo
	Río Prieto, Lares
	Río Prieto, Yauco
	Ríos, Patillas
	Robles, Aibonito
	Robles, San Sebastián
	Rocha, Moca
	Roncador, Utuado
	Rosario, Mayagüez
	Rosario Alto, San Germán
	Rosario Bajo, San Germán
	Rosario Peñón, San Germán
	Rubias, Yauco
	Rucio, Peñuelas
	Rufina, Guayanilla

S

	Sábalos, Mayagüez
	Sabana, Luquillo
	Sabana, Orocovis
	Sabana, Vega Alta
	Sabana Abajo, Carolina
	Sabana Eneas, San Germán
	Sabana Grande, Utuado
	Sabana Grande Abajo, San Germán
	Sabana Grande barrio-pueblo
	Sabana Hoyos, Arecibo
	Sabana Llana, Juana Díaz
	Sabana Llana Norte, San Juan
	Sabana Llana Sur, San Juan
	Sabana Seca, Toa Baja
	Sabana Yeguas, Lajas
	Sabanetas, Mayagüez
	Sabanetas, Ponce
	Saco, Ceiba
   Sagrado Corazón subbarrio, Santurce
	Saliente, Jayuya
	Salinas barrio-pueblo
	Saltillo, Adjuntas
	Salto, Cidra
	Salto, San Sebastián
	Salto Abajo, Utuado
	Salto Arriba, Utuado
	Saltos, Orocovis
	San Antón, Carolina
	San Antón, Ponce
	San Antonio, Caguas
   San Antonio, Dorado
	San Antonio, Quebradillas
	San Cristóbal subbarrio, San Juan Antiguo
	San Francisco subbarrio, San Juan Antiguo
	San Germán barrio-pueblo
	San Ildefonso, Coamo
	San Isidro, Culebra
	San José, Quebradillas
	San José subbarrio, Oriente
	San Juan Antiguo, San Juan
   San Juan Moderno subbarrio, Santurce
	San Lorenzo, Morovis
	San Lorenzo barrio-pueblo
   San Mateo subbarrio, Santurce
	San Patricio, Ponce
	San Salvador, Caguas
	San Sebastián barrio-pueblo
	Santa Catalina, Coamo
	Santa Cruz, Carolina
	Santa Isabel, Utuado
	Santa Isabel barrio-pueblo
	Santa Olaya, Bayamón
	Santa Rita subbarrio, Hato Rey Sur
	Santa Rosa, Guaynabo
	Santa Rosa, Lajas
	Santa Rosa, Utuado
	Santana, Arecibo
	Santana, Sabana Grande
	Santiago, Camuy
	Santiago y Lima, Naguabo
	Santo Domingo, Peñuelas	
	Santurce, San Juan
	Sardinera, Fajardo
   Seboruco subbarrio, Santurce 
	Segundo, Ponce
	Sexto, Ponce
   Shanghai subbarrio, Santurce
	Sierra Alta, Yauco
	Sierra Baja, Guayanilla
	Sonador, San Sebastián
	Sonadora, Aguas Buenas
	Sonadora, Guaynabo
	St. Just, Trujillo Alto
	Stella, Rincón
	Sud, Cidra
	Sumidero, Aguas Buenas
	Sumido, Cayey
	Susúa, Sabana Grande
	Susúa Alta, Yauco
	Susúa Baja, Guánica
	Susúa Baja, Yauco

T

	Tabonuco, Sabana Grande
	Talante, Maunabo
	Tallaboa Alta, Peñuelas
	Tallaboa Poniente, Peñuelas
	Tallaboa Saliente, Peñuelas
	Tanamá, Adjuntas
	Tanamá, Arecibo
	Tejas, Humacao
	Tejas, Las Piedras
	Tejas, Yabucoa
	Tercero, Ponce
	Terranova, Quebradillas
	Tetuán, Utuado
	Tibes, Ponce
	Tierras Nuevas Poniente, Manatí
	Tierras Nuevas Saliente, Manatí
	Tijeras, Juana Díaz
	Toa Alta barrio-pueblo
	Toa Baja barrio-pueblo
	Toíta, Cayey
	Toíta, Cidra
	Tomás de Castro, Caguas
	Toro Negro, Ciales
	Torre, Sabana Grande
	Torrecilla Alta, Canóvanas
	Torrecilla Alta, Loíza
	Torrecilla Baja, Loíza
	Torrecillas, Morovis
	Tortugo, San Juan
   Tras Talleres subbarrio, Santurce
	Trujillo Alto barrio-pueblo
	Trujillo Bajo, Carolina
	Tumbao, Maunabo
	Tuna, San Germán
	Turabo, Caguas

U

    Ubarri subbarrio, Pueblo
	 Unibón, Morovis
	 Universidad, San Juan
	 Utuado barrio-pueblo

V

	Vacas, Villalba
	Vaga, Morovis
	Valencia subbarrio, Universidad
	Valenciano Abajo, Juncos
	Valenciano Arriba, Juncos
	Vayas, Ponce
	Vega Alta barrio-pueblo
	Vega Baja barrio-pueblo
	Vega Redonda, Comerío
	Vegas, Cayey
	Vegas, Yauco
	Vegas Abajo, Adjuntas
	Vegas Arriba, Adjuntas
	Veguitas, Jayuya
	Venezuela subbarrio, Pueblo
	Victoria, Aguadilla
	Viejo San Juan, San Juan
	Villalba Abajo, Villalba
	Villalba Arriba, Villalba
	Villalba barrio-pueblo
   Villa Palmeras subbarrio, Santurce
	Villa Sin Miedo, Canóvanas
	Viví Abajo, Utuado
	Viví Arriba, Utuado
	Voladoras, Moca

Y

	Yabucoa barrio-pueblo
	Yahuecas, Adjuntas
	Yauco barrio-pueblo
	Yaurel, Arroyo
	Yayales, Adjuntas
	Yeguada, Camuy
	Yeguada, Vega Baja

Z

 Zamas, Jayuya
 Zanja, Camuy
 Zarzal, Río Grande

See also

 Pueblos in Puerto Rico
 Special Communities in Puerto Rico
 List of islands of Puerto Rico

Notes

References

Communities